Dereköy (literally "creekville") is a Turkish place name and may refer to the following places in Turkey:

Dereköy, Akçakoca
Dereköy, Alanya
Dereköy, Aşkale
Dereköy, Aydın
Dereköy, Balya
Dereköy, Bayramören
Dereköy, Biga
Dereköy, Bozyazı
Dereköy, Çorum
Dereköy, Damal
Dereköy, Dursunbey
Dereköy, Elmalı
Dereköy, Emirdağ
Dereköy, Germencik
Dereköy, Gökçeada
Dereköy, Gönen
Dereköy, Gümüşova
Dereköy, Haymana
Dereköy, İznik
Dereköy, Karamanlı
Dereköy, Karacasu
Dereköy, Kargı
Dereköy, Kaş
Dereköy, Kemah
Dereköy, Koçarlı
Dereköy, Korkuteli
Dereköy, Kumluca
Dereköy, Kuyucak
Dereköy, Kırklareli
Dereköy, Lapseki
Dereköy, Manyas
Dereköy, Mengen
Dereköy, Mudanya
Dereköy, Mudurnu
Dereköy, Mut
Dereköy, Nallıhan
Dereköy, Orhaneli
Dereköy, Pazaryeri
Dereköy, Sason
Dereköy, Suluova
Dereköy, Taşova
Dereköy, Yeniçağa
Dereköy, Yenipazar, Aydın
Dereköy, Yenipazar, Bilecik
Dereköy, Yenişehir
Dereköy, Yeşilova